North Korea participated in the 1982 Asian Games in Delhi, India on November 19 to December 4, 1982. North Korea finished fifth in total medals and fourth in gold medals count.

References

Korea, North
1982
Asian Games